Kuno Raude (born 13 April 1941 Rakvere) is an Estonian architect and politician. He was a member of VII Riigikogu.

References

Living people
1941 births
Estonian architects
Members of the Riigikogu, 1992–1995
People from Rakvere